Lake Chaffee is a small, shallow, man-made lake located approximately  northwest of the hamlet of Westford in the town of Ashford in Windham County, northeastern Connecticut.

History
Lake Chaffee was formed sometime prior to 1934 by damming a small stream named Chaffee Brook. Before the dam was built, wetlands existed where the pond is now.

Description
Lake Chaffee's inflows consist of several intermittent small streams and runoff, and its outlet is Chaffee Brook, which flows east to the Mount Hope River. The lake's waters are held back by a  earthen dam; Chaffee Brook exits the lake via a  concrete spillway in the middle of this dam. It takes nearly six months for the lake's water to be completely exchanged.

Development
Today, Lake Chaffee is surrounded by a high-density area of houses which overlook the water. The houses are part of the Lake Chaffee census-designated place for statistical purposes.

Recreation
Lake Chaffee is home to two beaches and a boat launch, which are open to lake residents. Swimming, fishing, canoeing, kayaking and skating are popular activities on the lake. Use of gasoline-powered engines is not permitted on, over, or above Lake Chaffee.

Flora and fauna
Lake Chaffee is an excellent fishery, with a healthy population of largemouth bass, black crappie, chain pickerel, and yellow perch. The largemouth bass average in the two-pound class, with larger fish in the four- to six-pound class being common.

Lake Chaffee is home to abundant aquatic vegetation, which occasionally must be harvested to enable recreational activities.

References

Ashford, Connecticut
Bodies of water of Windham County, Connecticut
Ponds of Connecticut